Unspeakable is a 2000 exploitation film written and directed by Chad Ferrin and starring Roger Garcia, Tina Birchfield, and Timothy Muskatell.

Plot 

On his way home from a party, James Fhelleps is involved a car crash that kills his daughter Heather, and leaves his wife Alice disfigured, paralyzed and catatonic. While James aimlessly wanders the city, Alice is cared for by Barry, a coprophilic physical therapist who sexually abuses her. One day, James gives a prostitute named Emmy Bruzze a lift to her house, where James experiences a psychotic break when Emmy tries to seduce him, resulting in him killing her. As James stares at Emmy's body in shock, it begins speaking to him in Heather's voice, begging for help and claiming that God is keeping her from him. James returns home, gets rid of all religious objects in the house, and holds a conversation with Alice, who he is convinced communicates with him telepathically.

James (who is revealed to have molested Heather) believes he can somehow bring Heather back and "beat" God by killing street people, and those who associate with them. After murdering a perverted priest, James is held at gunpoint by Slick, a minion of "street king" Hell, but wounds his assailant, having one of his ears shot off in the struggle. A mob of homeless then attack James, forcing him to flee to his apartment, where he catches Barry having sex with Alice. James disfigures Barry (who narrowly escapes, only to commit suicide in his own home out of fear of prison) and leaves, rigging the place so that it explodes when Slick breaks in, killing him and Alice.

In a daze, James stumbles onto Hell and his lackey Marco harassing a prostitute and her daughter, and kills the two thugs, being shot in the process. The ambiguous ending of the film shows James getting out of bed, going into Heather's bedroom, and telling her to be quiet.

Cast 

 Roger Garcia as James Fhelleps
 Tamara Noll as Alice Fhelleps
 Leigh Silver as Heather Fhelleps
 Larry Richards as Doctor Gordon
 Rae Robison as Nurse Bava
 Eddie Shea as The Priest
 Timothy Muskatell as Barry A. Carter
 Tina Birchfield as Jess St. James/Hena
 Stephanie Lane as Sweet Jane
 Scott Vogel as Thirsty Nerd
 Jean Keller as Emmy Bruzze
 Gregory Lee Kenyon as Slick
 Wolf Dangler as Hell
 J.M. Wilkerson as Marco
 Richard Gunn as Jixer

Reception 

Film Bizarro wrote that Unspeakable showed promise, concluding "The movie wins points by being fairly ambitious. It's relatively well shot, has some varying effects that mostly look good, actors that seem to handle their characters rather well (even if outrageous at times) and no matter how bad the plot might be at times at least it works within the frames of the film". A two and a half out of five was awarded by Dread Central, which criticized the pace and uninteresting subplots, but wrote, "It's a commendable first effort though, limitations considered, and most certainly does the job of delivering an angry wallop straight to the gut".

References

External links 

 
 

2000 films
Incest in film
Films about rape
Films about drugs
2000s exploitation films
2000s serial killer films
Transgender-related films
American crime films
Religious horror films
2000 directorial debut films
Films about disability
Films about prostitution in the United States
LGBT-related horror films
Troma Entertainment films
American independent films
American LGBT-related films
Films directed by Chad Ferrin
Films about homelessness
Films set in Los Angeles
Films shot in Los Angeles
2000 LGBT-related films
2000 horror films
2000s crime films
2000s English-language films
2000s American films